Dannite Hill Mays (April 28, 1852 – May 9, 1930) was a U.S. Representative from Florida.

Born near Madison, Florida, Mays attended the county schools, the public schools of Savannah, Georgia, and Washington and Lee University, Lexington, Virginia.
He moved to Monticello, Florida, and engaged in agricultural pursuits.
He served as delegate to the Democratic State convention in 1888.
He served as member of the State house of representatives in 1891, 1895, and 1897, serving as speaker in 1897.
He was an unsuccessful candidate for Governor in 1900 and 1904.

Mays was elected as a Democrat to the Sixty-first and Sixty-second Congresses (March 4, 1909 – March 3, 1913).
He was an unsuccessful candidate for renomination in 1912.
He returned to Monticello, Florida, and resumed agricultural pursuits.
He died in Monticello, Florida, May 9, 1930.
He was interred in Roseland Cemetery.

References

External links
 

1852 births
1930 deaths
Burials in Florida
Democratic Party members of the United States House of Representatives from Florida
Speakers of the Florida House of Representatives
Democratic Party members of the Florida House of Representatives
People from Madison, Florida
People from Monticello, Florida